What's the Worst That Could Happen? is the soundtrack to Sam Weisman's 2001 film What's the Worst That Could Happen?. It was released on May 29, 2001, through NY.LA Music and consisted of a blend of hip hop and contemporary R&B music. The soundtrack found some success on the Billboard charts, making it to number 38 on the Billboard 200, number 6 on the Top R&B/Hip-Hop Albums and number 11 on the Top Soundtracks. Two singles and music videos were released for the songs "Music" and "Bang ta Dis".

Track listing

Notes
 signifies a co-producer.

Sample credits
Track #3 contains samples from "High Hopes" as performed by Frank Sinatra
Track #9 contains a sample of "Whatever Lola Wants" as performed by Sarah Vaughan
Track #10 contains elements from "Papa Don't Take No Mess"
Track #11 contains samples from "Music" as performed by Marvin Gaye
Track #12 contains a sample of "I'm Gonna Wash That Man Right Outa My Hair"

References

External links

Hip hop soundtracks
2001 soundtrack albums
Comedy film soundtracks
Rhythm and blues soundtracks
Albums produced by the 45 King
Albums produced by Erick Sermon
Albums produced by DeVante Swing